Abu Dhabi Northeast Airport , also known as Sweihan Air Base, is a military airport located in Abu Dhabi, United Arab Emirates. The airbase was built somewhere around 1988-1990 and it was just a runway, short taxiway and an apron, till 2010 where it underwent a major upgrade, which included new 3800m CAT II runway, new taxiways parallel to the runway, more parking’s and newer facilities for the airport. The expansion was completed in 2014. 

Abu Dhabi Northeast Airport is located at an altitude of 26.82 meters above sea level.

References

Airports in the United Arab Emirates